And Jesus Wept is an outdoor sculpture installed across from the Oklahoma City National Memorial in Oklahoma City, in the U.S. state of Oklahoma. The statue was erected by the Saint Joseph Catholic Church. During the Oklahoma City bombing, the Parish House of the church was severely damaged and later demolished; this sculpture was erected on that site.

References

Outdoor sculptures in Oklahoma City
Sculptures of men in Oklahoma
Statues of Jesus